Southampton Airport  is an international airport located in both Eastleigh and Southampton, Hampshire in the United Kingdom. The southern tip of the runway lies within the Southampton unitary authority boundary with most of the airport, including all of the terminal buildings, within the Borough of Eastleigh.

The airport handled nearly two million passengers during 2016, an 8.8% increase compared with 2015, making it the 18th busiest airport in the UK. Southampton Airport has a CAA Public Use Aerodrome Licence (Number P690) that allows flights for the public transport of passengers or for flying instruction. The airport is owned and operated by AGS Airports which also owns and operates Aberdeen and Glasgow Airports. It was previously owned and operated by Heathrow Airport Holdings (formerly known as BAA).

Up to March 2020, 95% of the flights from Southampton were operated by Flybe. However, the airline went into administration on 5 March 2020 with all flights cancelled. When Flybe was purchased and relaunched, it was announced that they would start serving Southampton Airport from the 23rd of July 2022.

History

Aviation began at the site in 1910 when pioneer pilot Edwin Rowland Moon used the meadows belonging to North Stoneham Farm as a take-off and landing spot for his monoplane, Moonbeam Mk II. The site became known as Eastleigh Airfield.

World War I
The Royal Flying Corps earmarked the site as an aircraft acceptance base during World War I, but when forces from the United States Navy Air Service (NAS) arrived in 1917 it was handed over to them and designated NAS Eastleigh. Work on the building of hangars which had begun under the Royal Flying Corps was accelerated. At the peak of the American presence, some 4,000 officers and men were billeted in tents and huts along the adjacent London to Southampton railway line.

Inter-War years

After the war, the site became a transit camp for refugees, mainly Russian, who wished to sail to America from the port of Southampton. Shipping companies Cunard and White Star Line (the Oceanic Steam Navigation Company), together with the Canadian Pacific Railway, formed the Atlantic Park Hostel Company to house them temporarily. In 1921 the hangars were converted into dormitories, kitchens and dining rooms.

The hostel was intended as a short-term clearing house for those trans-migrants changing ships, but following changes to United States immigration law which restricted entry under national origins quotas, some residents were forced to stay much longer. In 1924 about 980 Ukrainian Jewish would-be emigrants were cared for at the hostel. Some of them were still there seven years later, stranded between the US and UK which would not accept them, and unable to return to the countries they had fled. Atlantic Park had a school, library, and synagogue; the refugees formed football teams that played local sides and took part in local events, such as Eastleigh carnival. At the height of its use 20,000 passed through Atlantic Park in 1928 but then numbers started to fall away, leading to the closure of the hostel in 1931.

In 1932, Southampton Corporation purchased the site and it became Southampton Municipal Airport. By 1935, part of the site was being used by the RAF and was briefly known as RAF Eastleigh before it became RAF Southampton in 1936. Also in 1936, Supermarine opened a flight test facility on the site and built a large new Flight Shed at the south end of the aerodrome in 1937-38 and construction of the vast Cunliffe-Owen Aircraft factory between this and Wide Lane soon followed. The latter factory was better known post-war for production of  the Ford Motor Company's Transit vans until this finally closed in 2013 - leaving only the almost forgotten Supermarine Flight Shed which had accommodated so many Spitfires locally before their first flights and deliveries to the RAF. Sadly, despite its obvious historical significance, this 84-year-old building is now set for demolition and redevelopment with modern industrial units.

World War II
The first test flight of the Supermarine Spitfire took place at the airport on 5 March 1936, an event commemorated in 2004 by the erection of a two-thirds size sculpture of K5054, the prototype Spitfire, at the road entrance. On 5 March 2006, five restored Spitfires took off from Southampton Airport to commemorate the 70th anniversary of the first test flight of the Spitfire. The local council wanted to rename the airport after R. J. Mitchell, designer of the Spitfire. However, the airport owner at the time, Heathrow Airport Holdings, did not agree.

The military site was transferred to naval command in 1939 and renamed HMS Raven, and spent most of the war in a ground and air training role for the Royal Navy. It passed back into civilian ownership in April 1946.

Development after World War II 

The Cierva Autogiro Company rented portions of the Cunliffe-Owen plants from 1946, but had to move to another location on the field when it was acquired by Briggs. In 1951 Saunders-Roe took over the interests of Cierva Autogyro and built a rotor testing building on the eastern side of the airfield, which is now derelict. They continued operations on the field until about 1960.

During the 1950s, a mainstay of business for the airport was the cross-channel car ferry service operated by Silver City Airways using Bristol Freighters and Superfreighters.

In 1959, Southampton (Eastleigh) Airport was purchased by racing pilot J.N. 'Nat' Somers, who laid the foundation for the regional airport that exists today by building the concrete runway in 1963 and negotiating with British Rail to build Southampton Airport Parkway railway station next to the airport. Somers also worked with the Department of Transport to plan for the new M27 motorway to pass through the airport just south of the runway and north of Ford's plant, at the same time installing a major roundabout outside the airport. This forward-thinking programme encouraged most of the airlines at Bournemouth Hurn to move to Southampton in the mid-1960s. In 1988 Somers' company sold the airport to Peter de Savary, who a few years later sold it to the owners of London Heathrow.

In 1993, construction of a new terminal began after an investment of £27 million by Heathrow Airport Holdings. It was completed in 1994 and opened by Prince Andrew, the Duke of York.

21st century 
Southampton Airport has one main ground handler, Swissport (Servisair), who took over from Aviance. They handle all passenger services and ramp operations for all airlines except for Aurigny Air Services who operate their own ground handling.

In 2003, the airport reached 1 million passengers.

In 2010, the airport arranged a series of events to commemorate the 100th anniversary of the first flight at the airport. In 2012, the Olympic flame visited the airport as part of the torch relay for the 2012 Olympics, in London. In October 2014, Heathrow Airport Holdings reached an agreement to sell the airport, together with those at Glasgow and Aberdeen, for £1 billion to AGS Airports, a consortium of Ferrovial and Macquarie Group.

In 2016 the airport won the Airport of the Year award of the European Regional Airlines Association, having demonstrated extraordinary involvement with the local community and reducing its carbon footprint, whilst growing and expanding in a highly competitive market. In March of the same year, Aer Lingus Regional announced it would fly from Southampton to Cork Airport with an ATR 72, operated by Stobart Air. In 2017, the airport reached 2 million passengers. In 2019 Southampton was ranked third of 30 airports in the UK for customer satisfaction by Which? magazine, with a score of 77%. In May, Aer Lingus cancelled its flight to Cork Airport. On 5 June Air Force One touched down in Southampton carrying then president, Donald Trump. He then travelled to Portsmouth to mark the 75th anniversary of D-Day. The Boeing 757 was the biggest jet ever to visit Southampton.

When Flybe collapsed, the airport lost 95% of its routes. Over the next 12 months, multiple airlines would restart both old Flybe routes and some new routes.

On the 9 December 2020, British Airways (BA Cityflyer) announced they would fly to 13 destinations, mainly holiday destinations, to Spain, Portugal, France, Germany, Italy and Greece. These flights filled the void left by Flybe.

Operations

Terminal 
Southampton Airport has one terminal which has 12 stands. None of the stands are equipped with jet bridges. Inside the terminal, there are 19 check-ins, 11 of which are automated. Facilities include coffee shops, bars, stationers, a duty-free shop and an upstairs lounge.

Airfield 
Southampton has one asphalt runway. Historically, there were three runways: one following the current one, one intersecting the current runway at 90 degrees at the north side of the airfield, and one which crossed through the middle of the current runway. It is clearly visible where the northern runway was: it is why there is a panhandle at the north east of the airfield. All these runways were grass. The only remaining runway is 02/20 which is 1723 metres long and 37 metres wide. Only runway 20 has an Instrument Landing System. 02 has VOR/DME and NDB. Visual approach is allowed on both 02 and 20. The airport must close from 23:00 to 06:00, but can operate 10 flights monthly between those times. Helicopters are heavily restricted.

In September 2019, the airport announced plans to extend its runway north by 170m to allow it to support larger aircraft which would enable longer routes. The airport stated aims to increase passenger numbers from 2 million to 5 million by 2037. The managing director for Southampton Airport claimed that if the runway extension is not approved, the airport may have to close in 2021.

Airlines and destinations

The following airlines operate regular scheduled services to and from Southampton:

Statistics

Passenger numbers

Busiest routes

Ground transport

Rail 
Southampton Airport has a dedicated mainline railway station, . The station is a 60-second walk from the terminal, one of the closest airport links in Europe.

Car Hire 
There are eight car rental companies based in the multi-storey just outside the airport. These are Sixt, Alamo, Europcar, Enterprise, Hertz, National, Avis and Budget.

Bus 
Unilink buses run to Southampton city centre every 10–15 minutes throughout the day and take about 45 minutes; taxis are available outside Arrivals. Xelabus also runs services to Eastleigh and Hedge End.

Motorway 
The airport is near the junction between the M3 motorway and M27 motorway, giving easy road access to Southampton, Winchester, Bournemouth, Poole, Portsmouth and places between.

Bicycle 
Southampton Airport has designated parking and storage for bicycles. Southampton cycle route 7 is proposed to run just outside the airport, giving it a direct cycle path to the city centre. National Cycle Route 23 also runs outside the airport, running between Southampton and Reading via Basingstoke, Alresford, Winchester and Eastleigh.

Accidents and incidents
 On 10 June 1990, British Airways Flight 5390 suffered an explosive decompression over Didcot, Oxfordshire while flying from Birmingham to Málaga, Spain. With captain Tim Lancaster sucked halfway out of the cockpit, co-pilot Alastair Atchison managed to land the plane safely at Southampton with no fatalities. Two crew members including Lancaster were seriously injured, but all passengers were unharmed. This accident appeared on the National Geographic television programme Air Crash Investigation (known as Mayday in some countries).
 On 27 November 1992 Lockheed JetStar N6NE was substantially damaged after running off the end of the runway. No injuries sustained by the seven persons on board (crew of two plus five passengers). According to the following extract from the official AAIB report into the accident:
"During the final stage of an ILS approach to Runway 20 at Southampton, the aircraft reportedly encountered wind shear and the pilot increased power to compensate for a 10 knot loss of airspeed. The aircraft subsequently touched down some 500 feet along the runway.
During the landing roll, maximum braking was used but this appeared to be ineffective and the crew suspected that the aircraft was aquaplaning. Reverse thrust was activated, but the crew received no indication that it had deployed correctly, and assumed that it had not.
The aircraft was not stopped before the end of the runway and it overran by some 75 metres onto the grass. The accident happened in daylight (16:16 Local Time) but in poor weather with low cloud and rain, wind 150 degrees at 11 knots.
Runway 20 at Southampton has a landing distance of 1605 metres, and a concrete surface. The runway was wet. The aircraft was operating a flight from Istanbul."
Damage sustained to airframe: Per the AAIB report "Not reported". However, the aircraft was withdrawn from use and handed over to the fire crews at Southampton Airport for use as a training aid. It has not been burnt, but has been chopped into three pieces by the fire crew's axes, and was described on 23 March 2010 as being in a "poor state"
The plane overran the runway through the airport perimeter fence and onto the M27 motorway where it collided with two cars and caught fire. The two flight crew sustained minor whiplash injuries, and the three car occupants also sustained minor injuries. The aircraft was destroyed.

Notes
 The airport has a Southampton address, but is located in both Eastleigh and Southampton. Administrative authority is divided between Southampton City Council and Eastleigh Borough Council.

References

External links 

 

Airports established in 1917
1917 establishments in England
Heathrow Airport Holdings
Transport in Southampton
Airports in Hampshire
Southampton
History of Hampshire